152-mm gun model 1910/34 was a Soviet 152.4 mm (6 inch) heavy gun, a modernization of the 152-mm gun M1910/30, which in turn was based on 152-mm siege gun M1910.

Description
M1910/34 combined a barrel of the M1910/30 with a carriage of the 122-mm gun M1931. The barrel was of built-up construction; it was equipped with interrupted screw breechblock and recoil system consisting of hydraulic buffer and hydro-pneumatic recuperator. The split-trail carriage had leaf spring suspension and wheels with solid rubber tires.

Development and production history
The first upgrade of the 152-mm siege gun M1910 resulted in a weapon with improved characteristics, but didn't address some significant shortcomings, namely insufficient mobility (due to unsprung carriage and separate transportation of barrel) and limited traverse. The new modernization was an attempt to solve these problems by using a modern split trail carriage of the 122-mm gun M1931. A prototype went through ground trials starting 16 May 1934. The trials lasted until 16 January 1935, then the gun was given to the army for testing. The responses were mostly positive and the gun was officially adopted as 152-mm gun model 1910/34. Because of its maximum elevation angle of 45°, it was sometimes referred to as howitzer. In fact, even the developers initially called the piece 152-mm howitzer model 1932 and later 152-mm howitzer model 1934. The latter name can also be seen in some official documentation.

Production at the Perm plant started in 1934 and continued until 1937, with a total of 275 pieces built.

Organization and employment
According to RKKA organization, 152-mm guns were employed by corps artillery and by the Reserve of the Main Command, typically instead of 152-mm gun-howitzer M1937 (ML-20). Heavy gun regiments of Reserve of the Main Command had 24 pieces each.

According to different sources, at the outbreak of Great Patriotic War the Red Army possessed either 146 M1910/34s or all 275 pieces. These undoubtfully saw combat in the war, though due to their limited number the details of their service are unknown. A few pieces were captured by Germans which adopted them as 15,2 cm K.433/2(r).

Summary
The second modernization of the M1910 significantly improved mobility and traverse of the gun. The barrel was not transported separately anymore, which meant much faster set up time. Improved elevation led to slightly longer range. However, there were still some problems. The elevation mechanism was combined with equilibrator in a single device - a construction which resulted in slow elevation. The maximum elevation angle of 45° was considered insufficient. Some elements of the gun, mostly of the upper carriage, were hard to produce. As a result, more attempts to improve the design followed, eventually resulting in the 152-mm gun-howitzer M1937 (ML-20).

Ammunition

Notes

References
Shirokorad A. B. - Encyclopedia of the Soviet Artillery - Mn. Harvest, 2000 (Широкорад А. Б. Энциклопедия отечественной артиллерии. — Мн.: Харвест, 2000.)
Ivanov A. - Artillery of the USSR in Second World War - SPb Neva, 2003 (Иванов А. Артиллерия СССР во Второй Мировой войне. — СПб., Издательский дом Нева, 2003.)
Shunkov V. N. - The Weapons of the Red Army - Mn. Harvest, 1999 (Шунков В. Н. - Оружие Красной Армии. — Мн.: Харвест, 1999.)

External links

World War II artillery of the Soviet Union
152 mm artillery
Military equipment introduced in the 1930s